HMS Asia was an 84-gun second rate ship of the line of the Royal Navy, launched on 19 January 1824 at Bombay Dockyard.

She was Codrington's flagship at the Battle of Navarino.

She served in the Syria campaign against Mehemet Ali, in the Eastern Mediterranean, 1840–41

In 1858 she was converted to serve as a guardship, and during several years she was flagship of the Admiral-Superintendent of Portsmouth Dockyard.

In 1908 she was sold out of the navy.

Notes

References

Lavery, Brian (2003) The Ship of the Line - Volume 1: The development of the battlefleet 1650-1850. Conway Maritime Press. .

External links
 

Ships of the line of the Royal Navy
Canopus-class ships of the line
British ships built in India
1824 ships